is a private university in Kobe, Hyōgo, Japan, established in 1988.

External links
 Official website 

Educational institutions established in 1988
Private universities and colleges in Japan
Universities and colleges in Hyōgo Prefecture
Kansai Collegiate American Football League
1988 establishments in Japan